St Patrick's are a Gaelic Athletic Association hurling club in East County Kerry, Ireland. They draw their players mainly from Killarney, Rathmore, Killorglin, St Mary’s and Spa/ Glenflesk. A one time senior club they now play in the Junior Championship and the Junior County League Division 3.

Honours
 Kerry Intermediate Hurling Championship: (2) 1983, 1990
 Kerry Junior Hurling Championship: (4) 2007, 2010, 2013, 2014
 Kerry Novice Hurling Championship: (1) 2004
 Kerry Hurling League Div 2: (1) 1985

References

Gaelic games clubs in County Kerry
Hurling clubs in County Kerry
1982 establishments in Ireland